Egodahage George Wilfred Alwis Samarakoon (13 January 1911 – 2 April 1962) known as Ananda Samarakoon was a Sri Lankan (Sinhalese) composer and musician. He composed the Sri Lankan national anthem "Namo Namo Matha" and is considered the father of artistic Sinhala music and founder of the modern Sri Lankan Sinhala Geeta Sahitya (Song Literature). He committed suicide in 1962.

Early life and education 
Born on 13 January 1911 as Egodahage George Wilfred Alwis Samarakoon, to Samuel Samarakoon, Chief Clerk to British-owned Maturata Plantations and Dominga Peries in Watareka, Padukka. He was the second of four sons in a Christian family. Samarakoon received his primary education at Wewala School and thereafter attended CMS Sri Jayawardenepura College (Christian College, Kotte). His Sinhala Guru was Pandit D.C.P. Gamalathge. Later he served his Alma mater as a teacher of Music and Art.  Samarakoon left for the Visva-Bharati University, Santiniketan in India to study art and music. After six months he abandoned his studies and returned to Ceylon, and changed his name to Ananda Samarakoon, embracing Buddhism. Then he served as the music teacher of Mahinda College, Galle from 1938 to 1942.

Career

Composer
In 1937, the popular music of Sri Lanka consisted of songs derived from the North Indian Ragadhari music. These songs lyrics often contained meaningless phrases with little or no literary merit. Samarakone set out to create a form of a music that can be classified as Sri Lanka's own and came out with the song  Ennada Menike (එන්නද මැණිකේ)  (1940) that paved the foundation for the artistic Sinhala music. In 1940, he composed Namo Namo Mata to instill patriotism and love for one's country, in his students at Mahinda College.It was first sung by little Mahindians at the prestigious Olcott Hall. That song was later selected as the National anthem of Sri Lanka by the Sri Lankan government.

The love themed song Endada Menike unfolds in the form of a dialogue between a young village boy and a girl. Poetic and beautifully rustic, it became a success and Samarakone followed it with a string of successful songs in the early to mid-1940s, the period considered his golden age. Among his best known works are: 
Podimal Etano (පොඩීමල් එතනෝ)
Vilay Malak Pipila
Poson Pohoda
Asay madura
Sunila Guvanay
Punchi Suda
Nilvala Gangay
Sumano
Pudamu Kusum
Siri Saru Saara Ketay

Painter
In 1945, Samarakoon's only son died at the age of five, and the grieving Samarakoon left Sri Lanka for India where he pursued a painting career and held eleven art exhibitions there. Though his painting were critically acclaimed, he returned to music in 1951 back in Sri Lanka.

National anthem
One of Samarakoon's early compositions, Namo Namo Mata was nominated as the national anthem and was officially adopted as the national anthem of Ceylon on 22 November 1951, from a committee headed by Sir Edwin Wijeyeratne. Critics attacked Namo Namo Mata, particularly the "Gana" significance of the introductory words (Namo Namo Matha) which designate disease and ill luck to the political leaders of the country. Samarakone who has completed Ghana Shasthra studies in India, clearly stated the ones who were asking to change the lyrics, that he is the only one to complete Ghana Shastra studies in India and that he would knows if there is any mistake or not. But after some days, he was asked to visit the SL broadcasting cooperation and had made to listen to his song which had been changed without his knowledge and consent.

Death
On 5 April 1962, at the age of fifty one, Samarakoon committed suicide by taking an overdose of sleeping tablets.

References

1911 births
1962 suicides
Drug-related suicides in Sri Lanka
National anthem writers
Converts to Buddhism from Christianity
Sri Lankan Buddhists
Visva-Bharati University alumni
Sri Lankan composers
20th-century Sri Lankan painters
Sinhalese singers
20th-century Sri Lankan male singers
Faculty of Mahinda College, Galle
Buddhist artists
1962 deaths